Mălăieşti may refer to the following places:

Romania
 Mălăieşti, a village in Sălașu de Sus Commune, Hunedoara County
 Mălăieşti, a village in Râfov Commune, Prahova County
 Mălăieşti, a village in Vutcani Commune, Vaslui County

Moldova
 Mălăieşti, Orhei, a commune in Orhei district
 Mălăieşti, Transnistria, a commune in Transnistria
 Mălăieşti, a village in Bălăbăneşti Commune, Criuleni district
 Mălăieşti, a village in Gălăşeni Commune, Rîşcani district

See also 
 Mălăiești River (disambiguation)
 Mălădia (disambiguation)
 Mălăești (disambiguation)